 
Major Karl-Erich Kühlenthal (1908 – October 25, 1975) was a German spy and one of the most senior  agents in Spain during World War II.

Although the head of German intelligence in Spain was then Wilhelm Leissner, alias "Gustav Lenz"codename "Heidelberg", Admiral Wilhelm Canaris had taken a shine to Kühlenthal to the extent that Leissner was effectively superseded. Kühlenthal's reports were very well received in Berlin, albeit that (from a British point of view) Kühlenthal was so easily duped that he "was the ideal spy to pass (dis)information, because he was worse than useless".

Kühlenthal was a Mischling—"a half-blood Jew" with a Jewish grandmother, Canaris had managed to secure an Aryan certificate for him in 1941.

In 1943, when the body of "Major William Martin"—a Royal Marine attached to Combined Operations—had washed up on a beach in Spain after a possible plane crash, Kühlenthal thought he had found important classified documents on the British major's body. In fact, the documents were false and the body part of a fake persona to lend credibility. These were part of Operation Mincemeat, a plan to convince the Germans that the Allies planned to invade Greece and Sardinia instead of Sicily. It is not certain if Kühlenthal was convinced by the documents, but he passed them on to his superiors, who "swallowed Mincemeat whole".

References

Notes

Citations

Bibliographies

External links 
 History of Dienz family (in German) Does not cover Kühlenthal's spy activities.

1908 births
1975 deaths
German people of Jewish descent
Operation Mincemeat
World War II spies for Germany